Shih Chia-hsin (November 9, 1922 – November 27, 2013) was a Taiwanese liberal politician, financier and teacher. Born in the prosperous harbour of Donggang, he was twice elected as mayor of his hometown, in 1953 and 1956. Widely seen as a successful municipal administrator, Shih was forced out of politics for his disobedience to the Kuomintang (KMT) regime. Shih spent his later life working in the financial field and became the first generation of Taiwanese bankers. First worked as a local manager, Shih was promoted as the business manager of Cathay Life Insurance, one of the largest business corporations in Taiwan for decades. From 1988 to his retirement in 2008, Shih served as executive director of Chinfon Commercial Bank.

Major Achievements as the Mayor of Donggang 

Reconstruction of Donggang fishing harbour
Construction of the Health Services Building in Donggang
Modernisation of bridges in Donggang town centre
Enhancement embankments in Donggang town centre
Supply of comprehensive municipal water to the town centre and barrack areas
Realisation of the first balanced town budget
Introduction of new aquafarming techniques 
Restoration of Donggang King Boat Festival prohibited by KMT

References 

1922 births
2013 deaths
Politicians of the Republic of China on Taiwan from Pingtung County